The Sacramento County Public Law Library (SCPLL) is a “public” law library in the capital city of the State of California.  In 1891 the state of California enacted statutes mandating an independent law library in every county.  Since its inception SCPLL has provided free public access to legal information.

Today, SCPLL is the sixth largest of California's 58 member libraries of the  Council of California County Law Libraries (CCCLL), a statewide networking and advocacy organization. The organization has an active role in state legislative efforts in support of county law library funding.

History 

SCPLL was established on March 31, 1891 in the county courthouse with 6,237 volumes.
 The law library would remain in the county courthouse, and in 1965 moved into the basement of the Gordon D. Schaber Sacramento County Courthouse which still houses the Sacramento Superior Court at 720 9th Street. From 1999 to 2010, a small branch library was maintained at the William R. Ridgeway Family Relations Courthouse on Power Inn Road.  In 2002, SCPLL relocated to the Sacramento Hall of Justice, a landmark building at 813 6th Street.
 This unique historic building, on the National Register of Historic Places, had undergone renovations in order to accommodate the library's collection.  Ten years later, due to rising costs, in 2012 the library moved to its current location at 609 9th Street in close proximity to the County Superior Court in downtown Sacramento.

Mission 

Since its founding days, the mission of the law library is to provide free access to legal information to the judiciary, to state and county officials, to members of the State Bar of California, and to all residents of the county. Today, the Law Library's primary patrons are members of the Sacramento County legal community and county residents representing themselves in legal matters. The Library provides access to justice   through resources to address civil legal issues.

Organization and Governance 

According to California Statutes, California county law libraries operate independently from the County government where they reside.

The SCPLL is governed by a seven-member Board of Trustees made up of 5 Superior Court judges, a County Counsel Board of Supervisors delegate, and a local attorney appointed by the County Board of Supervisors.  The law library, like other California county law libraries, is funded by a fixed percentage of the local county superior court civil filing fees, though the amount varies by county (dictated by statutes).  Thus, County Law libraries are supported by civil litigants, their primary users, and are not funded by state and local taxes.

Collection 

The SCPLL is a practice library, focusing on practical materials for attorneys and the public. The law library acquires and maintains major California primary and secondary legal resources, in addition to certain U.S. federal and general legal publications and self-help legal materials written for lay people.  The American Association of Law Libraries, County Public Law Library Standards is useful in the selection of resources.

The Law Library provides an online catalog that includes books, periodicals, audio recordings for attorney MCLE credit, CD-ROMS with forms, websites and has electronic access to thousands of additional titles including law journals, legal treatises, restatements, treaties and much more.  Onsite access is free at the law library to a select group of legal databases including: Thomson Reuters Westlaw, Lexis Advance (includes Shepards), HeinOnline, Ebsco's Legal Information Reference Center (Nolo self-help ebooks), CEB's OnLAW, and other e-subscriptions.

Highlights of Services 

 Saclaw.org website: Content for both the legal community and self-represented litigants including forms, self-help videos, and links to key legal resources.
 Legal Research Guides: Step-by-Step guides to common legal procedures and topics, created by our law librarians and available by subject on the Law 101 web pages.
 Lawyers in the Library: Brief 20 minute consultation with an attorney for people who cannot afford traditional private legal services.
 Ask Now Law Librarian : Service for the general public to submit questions to law librarians statewide using the website's interactive chat feature.
 MCLE CD's for Self-Study : Audio-visual resources that meet minimum continuing legal education (MCLE) requirements for members of the California State Bar Association.
Continuing Education Classes:  A variety of attorney classes in the law library's Training Center with qualified speakers, and some programs offered by video on the website.

Civil Self Help Center (CSHC) 

In 2008 the Sacramento County Superior Court received a grant to help fund a civil self-help center to assist self-represented litigants with general civil matters. The CSHC began as a joint project between the Sacramento Superior Court, the VLSP of Northern California, and the Sacramento County Bar Association.  When the Superior Court was faced with budget cuts and space constraints in 2009, the Law Library Director and Board of Trustees agreed to bring the CSHC into the Law Library as both provided assistance to self-represented litigants.

Today the CSHC is staffed with an attorney and a paralegal.  The purpose of the CSHC is to provide general information and basic assistance to individual self-represented litigants with qualifying civil cases. Help is provided either through workshops, quick assistance, referrals, or through a limited number of individual appointments. The legal staff provides assistance with a narrow list of issues, including simple complaints and answers for breach of contract, personal injury, and property damage; fee waivers; requests for, and motions to set aside, default judgments; name changes; oppositions to civil forfeiture; guardianship, and discovery.

Celebrating 125 Years of Service 

In 2016, the SCPLL joined the Council of California County Law Libraries in a celebration of 125 years providing services to individuals in the state.
 Senator Wolk introduced Senate Resolution S-83 in the 2015-2016 California Legislature commending California County Law Libraries and recognizing August 11, 2016 as “California County Law Library Day.”  The adopted resolution recognized the national crisis and growing number of individuals who do not have access to legal representation, and the service law libraries provide for access to justice by assisting self-represented litigants. “California County law Libraries are an essential component of the justice system and reduce stress on the overburdened court system in the state.” The County of Sacramento and the City of Sacramento adopted similar resolutions.

See also 
Public Law Libraries (U.S.)
Law Library
Sacramento County, California
Sacramento, California
American Association of Law Libraries
Sacramento County Superior Court

References

External links 

Sacramento County Public Law Library website: https://saclaw.org/
The SCPLL online catalog: https://scllhip.saclaw.org/ipac20/ipac.jsp?profile=
California's Ask Now Law Librarian Chat Service: http://www.publiclawlibrary.org/ask-now/
California Council of County Law Libraries: http://www.publiclawlibrary.org/

Libraries in Sacramento County, California
Buildings and structures in Sacramento, California
Law libraries in the United States
1891 establishments in California
Libraries established in 1891